"To See the Invisible Man" is the second segment of the sixteenth episode from the first season (1985–86) of the television series The Twilight Zone. It depicts a future society in which certain crimes are punished by strictly enforced social shunning. This segment is based on the short story by Robert Silverberg first published in Worlds of Tomorrow April 1963. In the original short story, the criminal is never named, and his one-year sentence was noted to begin on May 11, 2104.

Plot
Mitchell Chaplin is a boorish, obnoxious man who has been found guilty of being "cold" to those around him. He is sentenced to be "invisible" for one year. An implant placed on his forehead warns others not to acknowledge or interact with him in any way lest they be punished in a like manner. Mitchell laughs at the punishment. He takes advantage of his invisible status to steal food, taunt people, and trespass. At one point, he walks into a women's health spa. Although the ladies are forbidden to respond to his bad behavior, they shudder and cover up.

Mitchell's sentence becomes a lesson in humility, compassion, and empathy as he begins to feel the consequences of social isolation. Under the omnipresent eye of floating security drones that monitor their society, even other invisible people shun him under threat of having their sentences extended. Attempts to hide the implant under clothing are useless as the implant immediately senses and burns through anything that covers it. When a blind hobo begs, Mitchell gives him food and is glad to have someone thank him, until the hobo is warned he is interacting with an invisible man, causing him to angrily leave. Some drunken men deliberately run him down with their car, knowing that authorities cannot respond to an invisible man's plight. When Mitchell calls a hospital via a video phone, the nurse cannot register the report as Mitchell's implant prohibits him from being seen.

On the last day of his sentence two policemen come to his residence and remove the implant on his head. They invite him to have a drink with them in customary gesture of reinstating an invisible man back into society. He returns to his former job and his co-workers affirm that his punishment has changed him for the better.

Four months after completing his sentence, Mitchell is accosted in public by a woman who wears the scar of an implant and recognizes him as a former invisible man. Knowing the law, he initially ignores her but her pleas for him to talk to her move him to hug her. As they are surrounded by drones warning him that his actions are punishable by another year of invisibility, he declares that he can see the woman and that he cares about her suffering. The narrator says that this time around, Mitchell will wear his invisibility as a shield of honor, a "shield forged in the Twilight Zone".

External links
 
 Postcards from the Zone episode 1.40 To See the Invisible Man

1963 short stories
1986 American television episodes
Short stories by Robert Silverberg
The Twilight Zone (1985 TV series season 1) episodes
Works originally published in Worlds of Tomorrow (magazine)
Dystopian television episodes

fr:Voir l'homme invisible